School District 41 Burnaby is a school district in British Columbia with 41 elementary schools and 8 secondary schools. The district serves the City of Burnaby, located immediately east of Vancouver. The district has an enrollment of approximately 25,000 students.

Schools

See also
BC School for the Deaf, Elementary
List of school districts in British Columbia

References

External links

Education in Burnaby
41